Lasiopetalum dielsii, is a species of flowering plant in the family Malvaceae and is endemic to the south-west of Western Australia. It is a spreading shrub with hairy stems, heart-shaped leaves and pink or white flowers.

Description
Flowering occurs in December.

Taxonomy
Lasiopetalum dielsii was first formally described in 1904 by Ernst Georg Pritzel in Beitrage zur Kenntnis der Pflanzen Westaustraliens, ihrer Verbreitung und ihrer Lebensverhaltnisse. The specific epithet (dielsii) honours Ludwig Diels.

Distribution and habitat
This lasiopetalum grows on steep slopes in the Esperance Plains and Mallee biogeographic regions of south-western Western Australia.

Conservation status
Lasiopetalum dielsii is listed as "Priority Two" by the Western Australian Government Department of Biodiversity, Conservation and Attractions, meaning that it is poorly known and from only one or a few locations.

References

dielsii
Malvales of Australia
Flora of Western Australia
Plants described in 1904
Taxa named by Ludwig Diels